The Toronto Xtreme (formerly Toronto Renegades) were a Canadian rugby union team based in Markham, Ontario. The team played in the Rugby Canada Super League and drew most of its players from the Toronto Rugby Union.

Founded in 1999 as the Toronto Renegades, the team was Eastern Champions in 1999, 2001, and 2003. The Xtreme did not participate in the 2008 season which was the final year of RCSL.

Season-by-season records

|-
| colspan="6" align="center" | Toronto Renegades
|-
|1999 || 4 || 0 || 1 || 1st East Division || Lost Finals (Vancouver Island Crimson Tide)
|-
|2000 || 4 || 1 || 0 || 2nd East Division || —
|-
|2001 || 4 || 0 || 0 || 1st East Division || Lost Finals (Fraser Valley Venom)
|-
|2002 || 5 || 1 || 0 || 2nd East Division || —
|-
| colspan="6" align="center" | Toronto Xtreme
|-
|2003 || 4 || 0 || 0 || 1st East Division || Lost Finals (Calgary Mavericks)
|-
|2004 || 5 || 1 || 0 || 2nd East Division || –
|-
|2005 || 3 || 2 || 1 || 3rd East Division || —
|-
|2006 || 2 || 4 || 0 || 5th East Division || —
|-
|2007 || 3 || 3 || 0 || 4th East Division || —
|-
!rowspan="3"|Totals || 34 || 12 || 2
|colspan="2"| (regular season, 1999–2007)
|-
! 0 || 3 || 0
|colspan="2"| (playoffs, 1999–2007)
|-

Toronto Rebellion
In 2009, Rugby Canada disbanded the RCSL and started a new league called Rugby Canada National Junior Championship. The Toronto Rugby Union fielded a team known as the Toronto Rebellion during the 2009 RCNJC season.

External links
 Official Site

Rugby union teams in Ontario
Sport in Markham, Ontario
Rugby teams in Toronto